Bantry Pier railway station was on the Cork and Bandon Railway in County Cork, Ireland.

History

The station opened on 1 January 1909.

Regular passenger services were withdrawn in 1937 and the station closed in 1949.

Routes

Further reading

References

External links
 Eiretrains gallery – 21st century photos of former railway infrastructure in Bantry

Disused railway stations in County Cork
Railway stations opened in 1892
Railway stations closed in 1961